Fazlur Rahman Faruque is an Awami League politician and the former Member of Parliament from Tangail-8. He received the Ekushey Padak in 2021 for his contribution to Bangladesh Liberation war. Since 2017, he is serving as president of Tangail District unit of the Awami League. He is the District Council Administrator of Tangail District.

Career
Faruque was elected to Parliament in 1973 from Tangail-8 as an Awami League candidate.

Faruque contested the 1991 parliamentary election from Tangail-7 as a candidate of the Awami League. He received 41,392 and came second to Kh. Badar Uddin of the Bangladesh Nationalist Party who received 62,882 votes.

In 2008, he served as the General Secretary of the Tangail District unit of Awami League. In 2015, he supported citizens protesting the proposed addition of Tangail District to Mymensingh Division instead preferring the present Dhaka Division. He was elected President of Tangail District Awami League on 18 October 2015 at the triennial conference of the Tangail district unit of Awami League.

The triennial conference of the Tangail district unit of Awami League was held in November 2022 seven years after the last one in 2015 and Faruque was re-elected president of the District unit. On 24 December 2022, Faruque proposed the name of Sheikh Hasina to be the president of Awami League at its council. She went on to win her 10th consecutive term as president.

Personal life 
Faruque's only Son Khan Ahmed Shuvo is Member of Parliament from Tangail-7; elected in 2021 by-election called after the death of incumbent Ekabbar Hossain.

References

Awami League politicians
Living people
1st Jatiya Sangsad members
Year of birth missing (living people)
Recipients of the Ekushey Padak